Dotta stellata, the spangled sylph or spangled skipper, is a species of butterfly in the family Hesperiidae. It is found in Kenya, Tanzania, Malawi, Zambia, Mozambique and Zimbabwe. The habitat consists of forests.

Adults are on wing in August and again from January to April in two generations per year.

The larvae feed on Asystasia species.

Subspecies
Dotta stellata stellata - coast of Kenya
Dotta stellata amania Evans, 1947 - Tanzania: north-east to the Usambara, Nguru, and Uluguru mountains
Dotta stellata mineni (Trimen, 1894) - southern Tanzania, Malawi, Zambia, Mozambique, eastern Zimbabwe

References

Butterflies described in 1891
Astictopterini
Butterflies of Africa